RDV Sports, Inc. is a Michigan corporation set up by Richard DeVos to purchase the NBA franchise, the Orlando Magic. Established in 1991, its assets have included the Orlando Miracle WNBA team, Orlando Solar Bears of the ECHL and the RDV Sportsplex. 

In May 2017, RDV Sports agreed to purchase the Solar Bears when the Orlando Pro Hockey Operations, L.P. ownership group informed them that they could no longer sustain the team. The DeVos family were the owners of the IHL Solar Bears from 1995 through 2001.

Today the company owns the Magic, Orlando Solar Bears of the ECHL and the RDV Sportsplex.

References

Orlando Miracle owners
Orlando Magic owners
Sports management companies
Sports in Orlando, Florida
Entertainment companies established in 1991
1991 establishments in Michigan
Companies based in Orlando, Florida